Freddy Dolsi (born January 6, 1983) is a former Major League Baseball pitcher. 

In May 2008, Dolsi was called up to the Tigers from the Double-A Erie SeaWolves to replace injured Denny Bautista. Dolsi made his major league debut on May 6, 2008, in relief against the Boston Red Sox.  His first major league pitch was hit over the center-field fence in Comerica Park for a home run by Manny Ramirez.

Dolsi started the 2009 season with the Triple-A Toledo Mud Hens and has spent most of portions of the season with both the Tigers and the Mud Hens. Then on December 9, 2009, Dolsi was designated for assignment. He was claimed off waivers by the Chicago White Sox on December 18.

References

External links

1983 births
Living people
Birmingham Barons players
Charlotte Knights players
Detroit Tigers players
Dominican Republic expatriate baseball players in the United States
Erie SeaWolves players
Gulf Coast Tigers players
Lakeland Flying Tigers players
Lakeland Tigers players

Major League Baseball pitchers
Major League Baseball players from the Dominican Republic
Sportspeople from San Pedro de Macorís
Toledo Mud Hens players
West Michigan Whitecaps players